Henry Omaga-Diaz (born Henry Omaga on January 9, 1961) is a Filipino journalist, news anchor, radio newscaster and commentator working for ABS-CBN. He is the current weekday anchor of TV Patrol on ABS-CBN, DZMM Radyo Patrol 630, ABS-CBN TeleRadyo, ANC, Kapamilya Channel and A2Z and Omaga-Diaz Reports on DZMM Radyo Patrol 630 and ABS-CBN TeleRadyo. He is also the former news anchor of Bandila from 2006 to 2010.

Background
Omaga-Diaz came from the town of Guinobatan, Albay but was raised and grew up in Manila. He is a graduate of BS Journalism from the Lyceum of the Philippines University.

Recognition
Omaga-Diaz was awarded a spot among the Ten Outstanding Media Personalities by the International Media Associates, Inc.

Personal life
Omaga-Diaz is married and has a son. He is the brother of fashion designer Dong Omaga-Diaz.

Filmography
Omaga-Diaz started his journey in broadcasting in 1981 as a news writer for Radio Veritas.

References

1961 births
Filipino television news anchors
Living people
Bicolano people
People from Albay
Lyceum of the Philippines University alumni
Filipino radio journalists
ABS-CBN personalities
ABS-CBN News and Current Affairs people